Lac des Plagnes is a lake in Haute-Savoie, France.

Plagnes, Lac